George Muthoot may refer to:
 M. G. George Muthoot, Indian entrepreneur and businessman
 George Alexander Muthoot, Indian entrepreneur and businessman